In fluid dynamics,  the mixing length model is a method attempting to describe momentum transfer by turbulence Reynolds stresses within a Newtonian fluid boundary layer by means of an eddy viscosity. The model was developed by Ludwig Prandtl in the early 20th century. Prandtl himself had reservations about the model, describing it as, "only a rough approximation,"
but it has been used in numerous fields ever since, including atmospheric science, oceanography and stellar structure.

Physical intuition
The mixing length is conceptually analogous to the concept of mean free path in thermodynamics: a fluid parcel will conserve its properties for a characteristic length, before mixing with the surrounding fluid. Prandtl described that the mixing length,

In the figure above, temperature, is conserved for a certain distance as a parcel moves across a temperature gradient. So  can be seen as the temperature deviation from its surrounding environment after it has moved over this mixing length .

Mathematical formulation
To begin, we must first be able to express quantities as the sums of their slowly varying components and fluctuating components.

Reynolds decomposition

This process is known as Reynolds decomposition. Temperature can be expressed as:

,

In the above picture,  can be expressed in terms of the mixing length:

although the theoretical justification for doing so is weaker, as the pressure gradient force can significantly alter the fluctuating components. Moreover, for the case of vertical velocity,  must be in a neutrally stratified fluid.

Taking the product of horizontal and vertical fluctuations gives us:

.

The eddy viscosity is defined from the equation above as:

,

so we have the eddy viscosity,  expressed in terms of the mixing length, .

References

See also 
 Law of the wall
 Reynolds stress equation model

Oceanography
Turbulence